Viktor Ivanovich Anichkin (born December 8, 1941, in Sverdlovsk (now Ekaterinburg); died on January 5, 1975, in Moscow from heart failure) was a Russian footballer. He scored 15 goals from 322 matches in all competitions for Dynamo Moscow, of which 6 goals came from 282 league matches. He also played for Dynamo Bryansk.

International career
He earned 20 caps for the USSR national football team, and participated in the 1964 European Nations' Cup, where the Soviets were the runners-up, and also four years later in UEFA Euro 1968.

Honours
Dynamo Moscow
 Soviet Top League winner: 1963
 Soviet Top League runner-up: 1967, 1970
 Soviet Cup winner: 1967, 1970
 UEFA Cup Winners' Cup finalist: 1972
Individual
 Top 33 players year-end list: 1964, 1966, 1967, 1968, 1970

References

1941 births
1975 deaths
Russian footballers
Soviet footballers
Soviet Union international footballers
1964 European Nations' Cup players
UEFA Euro 1968 players
FC Dynamo Moscow players
FC Dynamo Bryansk players
Soviet Top League players
People from Sverdlovsk
Association football defenders